The 22nd Century BC are the years between 2199-2299 years before the birth of Jesus Christ

Events

4.2-kiloyear event – a severe aridification event that probably lasted the entire 22nd century BC and caused the collapse of several Old World civilizations.
2217 BC – 2193 BC: Nomadic invasions of Akkad.
 c. 2200 BC: Austronesians reached the Batanes Islands of the Philippine Archipelago as part of the Austronesian Expansion. 
c. 2184 BC: Possible date for the death of pharaoh Pepi II Neferkare, the longest reigning monarch of history with 94 years on the throne. 
c. 2184 BC: ephemeral rule of Merenre Nemtyemsaf II in Egypt.
c. 2184–2181 BC: Reign of Netjerkare Siptah, last pharaoh of the 6th Dynasty of Egypt, who would later give rise to the legendary figure of Nitocris.
c. 2181 BC: estimated date for the end of the Old Kingdom in Ancient Egypt and the start of the First Intermediate Period. Another proposed date is c. 2160 BC with the end of the Eighth Dynasty. The fall of the Old Kingdom may have been caused by a conjunction of severe droughts, strong decentralization of the state and confusion following the extremely long reign of Pepi II. 
c. 2181 BC: start of the Eighth Dynasty of Egypt with Menkare.
c. 2180 BC: Akkadian Empire fell under attack by the Guti (Mesopotamia), a mountain people from the northeast.
c. 2160 or 2130 BC: Egypt: end of the reign of pharaoh Neferirkare, last king of the 8th Dynasty. Beginning of the 9th Dynasty, possibly after overthrowing Neferirkare.
c. 2160 BC: Beginning of Middle Minoan period in Crete.
c. 2150 BC: Lagash was established.
c. 2150–2030 BC: Gilgamesh epic was written.
c. 2144 BC: Gudea, the ruler (ensi) of the city of Lagash, started to reign.
2138 BC: Babylon: A solar eclipse on 9 May and a lunar eclipse on 24 May occurred and are believed to be the double eclipse that took place 23 years after the ascension of king Shulgi of Babylon by those holding to the long chronology.
c. 2125 BC – 2055 BC: "Model of a house and garden, from Thebes". Eleventh dynasty of Egypt. It is now in the Metropolitan Museum of Art, New York.
2124 BC: Gudea, the ruler (ensi) of the city of Lagash, died.
c. 2120 BC: Votive statue of Gudea from Lagash (Iraq) was made. It is now in the Musée du Louvre.
2119 BC – 2113 BC: (middle chronology), Utu-hengal, first king of the third dynasty of Ur, also called the Neo-Sumerian Empire
2116 BC – 2110 BC: Uruk–Gutian war.
2112 BC – 2095 BC: Sumerian campaigns of Ur-Nammu.

References

 
-8
-78